Kane Tologanak  (born: ?) is a Copper Inuit and former Member of the Northwest Territories Legislature from 1979 to 1983.

Tologanak was first elected to the Northwest Territories Legislature in the 1979 Northwest Territories general election. He served one term and did not return when the legislature was dissolved in 1983. Kane Tologanak was listed as a member of the Committee for "Inuit Qaujimajatuqangit in the Government of Nunavut".

Tologanak is the first cousin to Nunavut MLA Donald Havioyak.

References

Members of the Legislative Assembly of the Northwest Territories
Living people
People from Cambridge Bay
Inuit from the Northwest Territories
Inuit politicians
Inuit from Nunavut
Year of birth missing (living people)